Semra is a given name. Notable people with the name include:
 Semra Aksu (born 1962), Turkish sprinter
 Semra Dündar (1943-2005), Turkish hematologist
 Semra Ertan (1956–1982), Turkish migrant worker and writer in Germany
 Semra Kebede (born 1987), Ethiopian beauty pageant titleholder, model and actress
 Semra Özal (born 1934), eighth First Lady of Turkey
 Semra Özdamar (born 1956), Turkish actress
 Semra Sezer (born 1944), First Lady of Turkey between 2000 and 2007
 Semra Ülkü, Turkish educator and university administrator
 Semra Yetiş (born 1987), Turkish mountain biker
 Semra Eren-Nijhar (born 1967), German-Turkish author and social commentator
 Semra Dinçer (1965-2021), Turkish actress
 Semra Güzel (born 1984) doctor and politician

Turkish feminine given names